Andrzej Bobola Maria Schinzel (5 April 1937 – 21 August 2021) was a Polish mathematician studying mainly number theory.

Education 
Schinzel received an MSc in 1958 at Warsaw University, Ph.D. in 1960 from Institute of Mathematics of the Polish Academy of Sciences where he studied under Wacław Sierpiński, with a habilitation in 1962. He was a member of the Polish Academy of Sciences.

Career 
Schinzel was a professor at the Institute of Mathematics of the Polish Academy of Sciences (IM PAN). His principal interest was the theory of polynomials. His 1958 conjecture on the prime values of polynomials, known as Schinzel's hypothesis H, both extends the Bunyakovsky conjecture and broadly generalizes the twin prime conjecture. He also proved Schinzel's theorem on the existence of circles through any given number of integer points.

Schinzel was the author of over 200 research articles in various branches of number theory, including elementary, analytic and algebraic number theory. He was the editor of Acta Arithmetica for over four decades.

References

External links 
 Schinzel's page at IM PAN (list of publications)
 Andrzej Schinzel's picture

1937 births
2021 deaths
20th-century Polish mathematicians
21st-century Polish mathematicians
Number theorists
Members of the Polish Academy of Sciences
University of Warsaw alumni
People from Sandomierz